Allan Holmes may refer to:

 Allan Holmes (footballer) (born 1952), Australian rules footballer 
 Allan Holmes (lawyer) (1845–1909), New Zealand cricketer and lawyer
 Allan Holmes (public servant) (born 1954), South Australian public servant